netpgp is a BSD licensed project based on the OpenPGP SDK which provides signing, verification, encryption, and decryption of files.  It also comes with the netpgpkeys tool for key management.  Netpgp is a higher level wrapper and improvement upon the OpenPGP SDK library written by Ben Laurie and Rachel Willmer.  The public api of OpenPGP SDK is hidden exposing a simple interface for encryption and decryption as well as generating and verifying digital signatures.

netpgp was included in the NetBSD distribution in May 2009 and in MidnightBSD in June 2009.

References

External links 
 NetPGP
 

Cryptographic software
NetBSD
OpenPGP
Privacy software